The following highways are numbered 510:

Canada
 Alberta Highway 510
 New Brunswick Route 510
 Newfoundland and Labrador Route 510
 Ontario Highway 510

Costa Rica
 National Route 510

Ireland
 R510 regional road

United States
  Interstate 510
  Interstate 510 (Arizona) (cancelled proposal)
  Florida State Road 510
  Maryland Route 510
  County Route 510 (New Jersey)
  Ohio State Route 510
  Washington State Route 510
Territories
  Puerto Rico Highway 510